Salvatore Mineo Jr. (January 10, 1939 – February 12, 1976) was an American actor. He was best known for his role as John "Plato" Crawford in the drama film Rebel Without a Cause (1955), which earned him a nomination for the Academy Award for Best Supporting Actor at age 17, making him the fifth-youngest nominee in the category.

Mineo also starred in films such as Crime in the Streets, Giant (both 1956), Exodus (1960), for which he won a Golden Globe and received a second Academy Award nomination, The Longest Day (1962), John Ford’s final western Cheyenne Autumn, and Escape from the Planet of the Apes (1971).

Early life and education 

Mineo was born in The Bronx, New York City, the son of coffin makers Josephine (née Alvisi) and Salvatore Mineo Sr. He was of Sicilian descent; his father was born in Italy and his mother, of Italian origin, was born in the United States. Mineo's sister  Sarina and brothers Michael and Victor were also actors. He attended the Quintano School for Young Professionals and was one of the few Italian-American actors of his era to keep his last name, saying he was proud of his heritage and identity.

Acting career

Child actor
Mineo's mother enrolled him in dancing and acting school at an early age. He had his first stage appearance in Tennessee Williams's play The Rose Tattoo (1951). He also played the young prince opposite Yul Brynner in the stage musical The King and I. Brynner took the opportunity to help Mineo better himself as an actor.

On May 8, 1954, Mineo portrayed the Page (lip-synching to the voice of mezzo-soprano Carol Jones) in the NBC Opera Theatre's production of Richard Strauss's Salome (in English translation), set to Oscar Wilde's play. Elaine Malbin performed the title role, and Peter Herman Adler conducted Kirk Browning's production.

As a teenager, Mineo appeared on ABC's musical quiz program Jukebox Jury. Mineo made several television appearances before making his screen debut in the Joseph Pevney film Six Bridges to Cross (1955). He beat out Clint Eastwood for the role. Mineo also successfully auditioned for a part in The Private War of Major Benson (1955), as a cadet colonel opposite Charlton Heston.

Rebel Without a Cause and stardom

Mineo's breakthrough as an actor came in Rebel Without a Cause (1955), in which he played John "Plato" Crawford, a sensitive teenager smitten with main character Jim Stark (played by James Dean). Mineo's performance resulted in an Academy Award nomination for Best Supporting Actor. At age 17, he became the fifth-youngest nominee in the category. Mineo's biographer Paul Jeffers recounted that Mineo received thousands of letters from young female fans, was mobbed by them at public appearances, and further wrote: "He dated the most beautiful women in Hollywood and New York City."

In Giant (1956), Mineo played Angel Obregon II, a Mexican boy killed in World War II. Many of his subsequent roles were variations of his role in Rebel Without a Cause, and he was typecast as a troubled teen. In the Disney adventure Tonka (1958), for instance, Mineo starred as a young Sioux named White Bull who traps and domesticates a clear-eyed, spirited wild horse named Tonka that becomes the famous Comanche, the lone survivor of Custer's Last Stand.
By the late 1950s, Mineo was a major celebrity. He was sometimes referred to as the "Switchblade Kid", a nickname he earned from his role as a criminal in the movie Crime in the Streets (1956).

In 1957, Mineo made a brief foray into pop music by recording a handful of songs and an album. Two of his singles reached the Top 40 in the United States' Billboard Hot 100. The more popular of the two, "Start Movin' (In My Direction)", reached No. 9 on Billboards pop chart. It sold over one million copies and was awarded a gold disc. He starred as drummer Gene Krupa in the movie The Gene Krupa Story (1959), directed by Don Weis with Susan Kohner, James Darren, and Susan Oliver. He appeared as the celebrity guest challenger on the June 30, 1957, episode of What's My Line?

Mineo made an effort to break his typecasting. In addition to his roles as a Native American brave in Tonka (1958), and a Mexican boy in Giant (1956), he played a Jewish Holocaust survivor in Exodus (1960); for his work in Exodus, he won a Golden Globe Award and received his second Academy Award nomination for Best Supporting Actor.

Career shift 
By the early 1960s, Mineo was becoming too old to play the type of role that had made him famous, and rumors of his homosexuality led to his being considered inappropriate for leading roles. For example, he auditioned for David Lean's film Lawrence of Arabia (1962) but was not hired. Mineo appeared in The Longest Day (1962), in which he played a private killed by a German after the landing in Sainte-Mère-Église. Mineo was baffled by his sudden loss of popularity, later saying: "One minute it seemed I had more movie offers than I could handle; the next, no one wanted me."

Mineo was the model for Harold Stevenson's painting The New Adam (1963). Now in the Guggenheim Museum's permanent collection, the painting is considered "one of the great American nudes". Mineo also appeared on the Season 2 episode of The Patty Duke Show: "Patty Meets a Celebrity" (1964).

Mineo's role as a stalker in Who Killed Teddy Bear (1965), which co-starred Juliet Prowse, did not seem to help his career. Although his performance was praised by critics, he found himself typecast again—this time as a deranged criminal. The high point of this period was his portrayal of Uriah in The Greatest Story Ever Told (1965). Mineo guest-starred in an episode of the TV series Combat! in 1966, playing the role of a GI wanted for murder. He did two more appearances on the same show, including appearing in an installment with Fernando Lamas.

In 1969, Mineo returned to the stage to direct a Los Angeles production of the gay-themed play Fortune and Men's Eyes (1967), featuring then-unknown Don Johnson as Smitty and Mineo as Rocky. The production received positive reviews, although its expanded prison rape scene was criticized as excessive and gratuitous. Mineo's last role in a motion picture was a small part in the film Escape from the Planet of the Apes (1971); he played the chimpanzee Dr. Milo.

In December 1972, Mineo stage-directed the Gian Carlo Menotti short opera The Medium in Detroit. Muriel Costa-Greenspon portrayed the title character, Madame Flora, and Mineo played the mute, Toby. In 1975, Mineo appeared as Rahman Habib, the assistant to a murderous consular head (portrayed by Hector Elizondo) of a Middle Eastern country, in the Columbo episode "A Case of Immunity," on NBC-TV. One of his last roles was a guest spot on the TV series S.W.A.T. (1975), in which he portrayed a cult leader similar to Charles Manson.

By 1976, Mineo's career had begun to turn around. While playing the role of a bisexual burglar in a series of stage performances of the comedy P.S. Your Cat Is Dead in San Francisco, Mineo received substantial publicity from many positive reviews; he moved to Los Angeles along with the play.

Personal life
In a 1972 interview with Boze Hadleigh, Mineo confirmed his bisexuality.  Mineo met English-born actress Jill Haworth on the set of the film Exodus in 1960, in which they portrayed young lovers. Mineo and Haworth were together on-and-off for many years. They were engaged to be married at one point. According to Mineo biographer Michael Gregg Michaud, Haworth cancelled the engagement after she caught Mineo engaging in sexual relations with another man. The two remained very close friends until Mineo's death. Mineo expressed disapproval of Haworth's brief relationship with the much older television producer Aaron Spelling (22 years older than her). One night, when Mineo found Haworth and Spelling at a private Beverly Hills nightclub, he punched Spelling in the face, yelling, "Do you know how old she is? What are you doing with her at your age?" At the time of his death, he was in a six-year relationship with male actor Courtney Burr III.

Death

On the night of February 12, 1976, Mineo returned home from a rehearsal for the play P.S. Your Cat Is Dead. After parking his car in the carport below his West Hollywood apartment, he was stabbed in the heart by a mugger. Mineo was found lying and bleeding profusely in the parking alley by neighbors who had heard his cries for help, but he was only able to walk a few steps, after which he collapsed and died immediately. Lionel Ray  Williams, a young pizza delivery man with a long criminal record, was convicted and sentenced in March 1979 to 57 years in prison for killing Mineo and also for committing ten robberies. Although considerable confusion existed as to what witnesses had seen in the dark the night Mineo was murdered, Williams claimed to have had no idea who Mineo was. Corrections officers later said they had overheard Williams admitting to the stabbing. Williams' wife later confirmed that on the night Mineo died, he had come home with blood on his shirt. After several years of speculation about the motives for the murder, 
the police investigation concluded that it was a random robbery. Williams was paroled in 1990 after serving 12 years.

Mineo was buried at Gate of Heaven Cemetery in Hawthorne, New York.

Filmography

Film

Television

Awards and nominations

See also 
List of oldest and youngest Academy Award winners and nominees – Youngest nominees for Best Actor in a Supporting Role
List of actors with Academy Award nominations
List of actors with two or more Academy Award nominations in acting categories
List of LGBTQ Academy Award winners and nominees

References

Citations

Sources

External links 

 
 
 
 

1939 births
1976 deaths
1976 murders in the United States
20th-century American male actors
20th-century American singers
20th-century American LGBT people
American bisexual actors
American male child actors
American male film actors
American male singers
American male stage actors
American male television actors
American murder victims
American people of Italian descent
American theatre directors
Best Supporting Actor Golden Globe (film) winners
Bisexual male actors
Bisexual men
Burials at Gate of Heaven Cemetery (Hawthorne, New York)
Deaths by stabbing in California
Deaths from bleeding
Entertainers from the Bronx
LGBT people from New York (state)
American LGBT singers
Male actors from New York City
Male murder victims
People murdered in California
Singers from New York City